Marko Dabro (born 28 March 1997) is a Croatian professional footballer who plays as a forward for Latvian Higher League club Riga on loan from Chinese Super League club Beijing Guoan.

Club career
Born in Vinkovci, Dabro went through the ranks of his hometown club HNK Cibalia, becoming a part of the Croatian youth national teams early as 2010, debuting as a 13-year old for the national U15 team. On March 30, 2013, he became the youngest player to debut in the Prva HNL, aged 16 years and 2 days, coming in from the bench in the 78th minute during the 1-0 away loss vs. RNK Split for Tomislav Mazalović.

In the summer of 2013 Dabro joined the youth ranks of the Italian giants ACF Fiorentina for an alleged sum of 1 million Euros. Not breaking through to Fiorentina's senior team, he was loaned back to HNK Cibalia in January 2016, rejoining the club permanently in the summer of 2016.

Following Cibalia's relegation, Dabro moved in the summer of 2018 to Gorica, but left the club in December of the same year, having made just 3 league caps for the team.

In 2019, he then joined NK Bravo.

In April 2022, Dabro joined Chinese Super League club Beijing Guoan.

In February 2023, Dabro joined Latvian Higher League club Riga on loan.

International career
Dabro was a member of each Croatian youth national football team from U-14 to U-20 level, having debuted for the U-15 national team as a 13-year old in 2010.

References

External links
 
 
 

1997 births
Living people
Sportspeople from Vinkovci
Association football forwards
Croatian footballers
Croatia youth international footballers
HNK Cibalia players
HNK Gorica players
NK Bravo players
NK BSK Bijelo Brdo players
NK Lokomotiva Zagreb players
Beijing Guoan F.C. players
Riga FC players
Croatian Football League players
First Football League (Croatia) players
Slovenian Second League players
Chinese Super League players
Latvian Higher League players
Croatian expatriate footballers
Croatian expatriate sportspeople in Italy
Croatian expatriate sportspeople in Slovenia
Croatian expatriate sportspeople in China
Croatian expatriate sportspeople in Latvia
Expatriate footballers in Italy
Expatriate footballers in Slovenia
Expatriate footballers in China
Expatriate footballers in Latvia